Lalbahadur Thapa Magar VC (Nepali: लालबहादुर थापामगर; February 1906 – 19 October 1968) was a Nepali Gorkha recipient of the Victoria Cross, the highest and most prestigious award for gallantry in the face of the enemy that can be awarded to British and Commonwealth forces.

Details
He was approximately 37 years old, and a Subedar in the 1st Battalion, 2nd Gurkha Rifles, in the Indian Army during World War II when the following deed took place for which he was awarded the VC.

On 5/6 April 1943 during the silent attack on Rass-es-Zouai, Tunisia, Subadar Lalbahadur Thapa, taking command of two sections, made his first contact with the enemy at the foot of a pathway winding up a narrow cleft which was thickly studded with enemy posts. The garrison of the out-posts were all killed by the subadar and his men, by kukri or bayonet and the next machine-gun posts were dealt with similarly. This officer then continued to fight his way up the bullet-swept approaches to the crest where he and the riflemen with him killed four - the rest fled. Thus secured, advance by the whole division was made possible.

He later achieved the rank of Subedar-Major

The medal

His Victoria Cross is displayed at The Gurkha Museum in Winchester, Hampshire, England.

See also
List of Brigade of Gurkhas recipients of the Victoria Cross

References

External links
Lal Bahadur Thapa
Burial location

1906 births
1968 deaths
Nepalese World War II recipients of the Victoria Cross
Nepalese recipients of the Victoria Cross
British Indian Army officers
Indian Army personnel of World War II
Gurkhas
Burials in Nepal